The Løwe House (Danish: Løwes Gård) is an 18th-century townhouse located at Bredgade 76 in the Frederiksstaden neighborhood of central Copenhagen, Denmark. The Royal Danish Naval Academy was based in the building from 1827 to 1865. It was listed on the Danish registry of protected buildings and places by the Danish Heritage Agency on 22 June 1991.

History

17th century

The property was formerly part of the extensive Sophie Amalienborg gardens. The present building on the site was constructed in 1754–57 for customs appraiser Christian Frederik Løwe. It was conveniently located close to the Custom House. His property was listed in the new cadastre of 1756 as No. 71 HH and No. 71 II in St. Ann's East Quarter. The two properties were marked as No. 330 and No. 331 on Christian Gedde's 1757 map of St. Ann's East Quarter.

The property was later acquired by major Adam Søbøtker. He also owned the country houses Hummeltofte, Marienborg and Rustenborg. At the 1787 census, Søbøtker resided in the building with the  unmarried woman Ane Marie Phillippine von Dumrecker, husjomfru Sophie Magdalene Winterberg, cooper (bødkersvend) Hans Piilegaard, a caretaker, a housekeeper, a gardener and the gardener's wife and 32-year-old daughter.

Søbøtker resided in the building until at least 1801.

The property was listed in the new cadastre of 1806 as No. 183 in St. Ann's East Quarter. It belonged to one etatsråd Lugge's widow at that time.

Royal Naval Academy, 1827-1865

The Royal Danish Naval Academy relocated to the building in April 1827. The academy had from 1677 been based in one of the four Amaliebborg mansions but this building was now converted into a new residence for Prince Frederick (BOO) in conjunction with his engagement to Frederick VI's youngest daughter.

Peter Frederik Wulff (1774-1842) was at the same time appointed as head of the Royal Danish Naval Academy. The writer Hans Christian Andersen was a close friend of the Wulff  family. He lived with them for a while after for a few weeks returning from his first major journey abroad in 1834. He moved in on 10 August and moved to Nyhavn 20 (then Nyhavn 280) on 1 September.

The property was home to 27 residents at the 1940 census. Peter Frederik Wulff resided in the building with his wife Jette Wulff, their sons Christian N. Wulff	and Peter H. C. Smith, one male servant and one maid. Christian C. Paludan, who was second-in-command at the Academy, resided in the building with his wife Hanne Jacobine Paludanm their 18-year-old daughter Karen Elisabeth Paludan, 21-year-old naval cadet Waldemar Grev Holck, 15-year-old naval cadet Heinrich J. Rambusch and one maid. Niels Olsenm inspector at the Admiralty, resided in the building with his wife Marie Lund and their two children (aged six and 16). The junior officers Edvard Hensen, Christian Schønheyder, Johan C. Tuxen, Christian Kraft, Wilhelm Pedersen and Eiler C. Groth	as well as the cadet Philip Schultz	were also residents of the building.	 Niels Andersen, a concierge at the Admiralty, resided in the building with his wife Anne Skriver, their two children (aged two and 14) and one maid.

At the time of the 1845 census, No. 173 A was home to a total of 19 people. They included the naval officers Christian captain Carl Paludan (1802-1817), captain lieutenant Christoph L. Prøsilius 1803 (1803-), lieutenant David Kall	 (1826-), first lieutenant Hermann Ipsen	(1808) and second lieutenant Johan Philip Schultz (1820-). The theologian Harald Ipsen	 (1813-) was also a resident in the building.

Later history
The  Toro Oil Corporation Denmark Limited A/S was in the 1920s based in the building. It was owned by Carl F. Glad. He resided with his wife Grethe at Store Mariendal in Hellerup and was also the owner of the country house Rågegården in Rågeleje . The company went bankrupt in connection with the Great Crash of 1929. 

The company M.B. Cohn A/S was later based in the building. The company moved to new premises at Vallensbækvej 65 in 1981.

The building was listed on the Danish registry of protected buildings and places by the Danish Heritage Agency on 22 June 1991.

Architecture

The building has a simple, Neoclassical facade with a three-bay median risalit crowned by a triangular pediment. The two-bay gate opens to a long narrow courtyard. The side wing along its north side was originally two buildings but they were merged into one building in the 1820s. At thefar end of the courtyard is a former stable and carriage house.

Today
The building is today owned by Jeudan and has been converted into a 948 square metre office building.

Café Petersborg
The restaurant Petersborg is located in the cellar.
In 1885 Hillary Clinton visited the restaurant as the guest of Lone Dybkjær during Bill Clinton's official visit to Denmark.

Gallery

References

External links

 Café Petersborg
 Source
 Source
 Source
 Source

Houses in Copenhagen
Listed residential buildings in Copenhagen
Buildings in Copenhagen associated with Hans Christian Andersen
Royal Danish Naval Academy
Frederiksstaden